This is a list of companies that have (or had) their primary listing on Euronext Dublin, based in Dublin. Many of these companies have secondary listings on other stock exchanges.

 
Companies,Euronext Dublin
Irish
Euronext